Mun Che-yong (born 1979) is a South Korean film director and screenwriter. Mun was assistant director of the films All for Love (2005) and Tazza: The High Rollers (2006). His directorial debut Shoot Me in the Heart (2015), starring Lee Min-ki and Yeo Jin-goo, is based on the award-winning novelist Jeong Yu-jeong's bestselling novel of the same name. The film was invited to the 28th Tokyo International Film Festival in 2015. His short film Twins (2007) won the Best Film in A Short Film About Love at the 2007 Mise-en-scène Short Film Festival.

Filmography 
Self Portrait (short film, 2002) - director 
Mother, Beauitiful May (2003) - actor
Life goes (short film, 2003) - sound
Please Stay with Me (short film, 2004) - director, screenwriter, music
All for Love (2005) - assistant director
The Art of Seduction (2005) - directing dept
Tazza: The High Rollers (2006) - assistant director 
Twins (short film, 2007) - director, screenwriter, storyboard
A Man Who Was Superman (2008) - directing dept, 2nd unit production
The King of XXX-Kissing (2012) - scenario team
Shoot Me in the Heart (2015) - director, screenwriter

References

External links 
 
 
 

1979 births
Living people
South Korean film directors
South Korean screenwriters